The Model State Constitution is "an ideal of the structure and contents of a state constitution that emphasizes brevity and broad functions and responsibilities of government," according to Ann O'M Bowman and Richard Kearney in State and Local Government.

The National Municipal League (now the National Civic League) first developed the Model State Constitution in 1921 to advocate constitutional reform based on a "higher-law tradition" (a state constitutional tradition based on basic and enduring principles that reach beyond statutory law) as opposed to "Positive Law Tradition" (a state constitutional tradition based on detailed provisions and procedure). The National Municipal League would revise the Model State Constitution five times with the last revision - the sixth version published in 1963. It does not promote partisan ideals or a particular political ideology but rather a simplistic, more concise, and more readable outline for state fundamental law that seeks to remain flexible to deal with emerging problems.

Articles 
The Model State Constitution has twelve basic articles:

 Bill of rights 
 Power of the state
 Suffrage and elections
 Legislative branch
 Executive branch
 Judicial branch
 Finance
 Local government
 Public education
 Civil service
 Intergovernmental relations
 Constitutional revision

The Constitution of Alaska was partially inspired by the Model state constitution.

See also
 Model act (model legislation)

References

External links 
 Downloadable PDF of Sixth Edition, 1963
 Online Editions at HathiTrust
 First Edition, 1921
 Revised Edition, 1924
 Fifth Edition, 1948
 Sixth Edition, 1963

Political systems